The Acro Sport is a single-seat aerobatic sportsplane designed by US aviation enthusiast Paul Poberezny in the early 1970s for homebuilding. Plans are marketed by Acro Sport Inc.

The Acro Sport is a short-span biplane of conventional taildragger configuration, typically built with an open cockpit and spatted main undercarriage. Its structure is a fabric-covered, steel tube fuselage and tail group, with a wood wing structure.

Variants

The Acro Sport II is the two place version of the Acro Sport I

Specifications

References

External links

Acro Sport aircraft
Biplanes
Single-engined tractor aircraft
Homebuilt aircraft
1970s United States sport aircraft
Poberezny aircraft
Aerobatic aircraft
Aircraft first flown in 1972